Peadar Kirby is an author and academic at the Department of Politics and Public Administration at the University of Limerick. Up to the academic year 2006/2007 he was a Senior Professor at the School of Law and Government, Dublin City University. He specialises in issues concerning Latin America. He is a fluent speaker of the Irish language. He was involved in the Centre for International Studies at Dublin City University. While there he gave lectures on 'Globalization: Global Political Economy', and 'Latin America: From colony to periphery.'

Kirby has published a number of books on the Economy of Ireland. He has also written on Latin America (including liberation theology), and is the author of a textbook on the subject (Introduction to Latin America: Twenty-First Century Challenges, 2003).

Published works
Books by Peadar Kirby include:
 Towards a Second Republic: Irish Politics after the Celtic Tiger with Mary Murphy, Pluto Press, 2011
 Celtic Tiger in Collapse: Explaining the Weaknesses of the Irish Model, Palgrave Macmillan, 2010
 Vulnerability and Violence: The Impact of Globalisation, Pluto Press, 2005.
 Introduction to Latin America: Twenty-first Century Challenges, SAGE Publications, 2003, .
 The Celtic Tiger in Distress: Growth with Inequality in Ireland, Palgrave Macmillan, 2002.
 Reinventing Ireland: Culture, Society and the Global Economy, Pluto Press, 2002.
 Rich and Poor: Perspectives on Tackling Inequality in Ireland, Oak Tree Press, in association with the Combat Poverty Agency, 2001.
 In the Shadow of the Tiger, DCU Press, 1998.
 Poverty Amid Plenty: World and Irish Development Reconsidered, Trocaire and Gill & Macmillan, 1997.
 Ireland and Latin America: Links and Lessons, Trócaire and Gill and Macmillan, 1992.
 Dialann ó Nicearagua, An Clóchomhar, 1990, .
 Has Ireland a Future?, Mercier Press, 1988.
 Is Irish Catholicism Dying?, Mercier Press, 1984.
 Lessons in Liberation: The Church in Latin America, Dominican Publications, 1981.

External links
 Peadar Kirby Website

Academics of the University of Limerick
Year of birth missing (living people)
Living people
Alumni of the London School of Economics